DYR may refer to:

 Askold and Dir, a semi-legendary 9th-century ruler of Kiev
 Dunyapur railway station, Punjab, Pakistan (station code DYR)
 DYR, the IATA code for Ugolny Airport in Siberia
 DYR 105.1 FM